This is a list of notable mainland settlements that are inaccessible from the outside by automotive roads (roads built to carry civilian passenger motor vehicles). These settlements may have internal roads or paths but they lack roads connecting them to other places.

Many road-inaccessible settlements are on islands or are very remote from other settlements.

Africa
 Lamu, Kenya

Asia
 Andryushkino, Russia
 Anadyr, Russia
 Batagay, Russia
 Batagay-Alyta, Russia
 Belaya Gora, Russia
 Chersky, Russia
 Chokurdakh, Russia
 Egvekinot, Russia
 Khonuu, Russia
 Kyusyur, Russia
 Nikolayevsk-on-Amur, Russia
 Norilsk, Russia
 Olenyok, Russia
 Olyokminsk, Russia
 Petropavlovsk-Kamchatsky, Russia
 Saskylakh, Russia
 Tiksi, Russia
 Zhigansk, Russia
 Zyryanka, Russia

Europe
 Cinque Terre, Italy
 Civita di Bagnoregio, Italy
 Inverie, Scotland
 Vorkuta, Russia
 Finse, Norway

North America
 Nuuk, Greenland, Kingdom of Denmark
 Tasiilaq, Greenland, Kingdom of Denmark
 Livingston, Guatemala
 Bethel, Alaska, United States
 Cordova, Alaska, United States
 Dillingham, Alaska, United States 
 Halibut Cove, Alaska, United States
 Juneau, Alaska, United States
 King Salmon, Alaska, United States 
 Nome, Alaska, United States
 Old Crow, Yukon, Canada
 Point Hope, United States
 Powell River, British Columbia, Canada
 Rankin Inlet, Nunavut, Canada
 Supai, Arizona in the Grand Canyon, United States
 Tyonek, Alaska, United States 
 Unalakleet, Alaska, United States 
 Yakutat, Alaska, United States
 Utqiaġvik, Alaska, United States

South America
 Iquitos, Peru in the Amazon rainforest
 Leticia, Amazonas, Colombia

See also
 List of car-free islands

References

Cities that are inaccessible by road

Inaccessible by road